The Pavillon Noir is a choreographic center in Aix-en-Provence, France.

Location
The Pavillon Noir is located at 530 avenue Mozart in Aix-en-Provence. It is near the Bibliothèque Méjanes.

History
The building was designed by Algerian-born French architect Rudy Ricciotti. Its construction began in 2004 and it was completed in 2006. It is made of steel and concrete. According to its officially website, it has "four rehearsal studios and one performance hall with 378 seats."

It was built especially to be the main rehearsal and performance center of the Ballet Preljocaj, a dance company choreographed by Angelin Preljocaj.

References

Buildings and structures in Aix-en-Provence
Sports venues completed in 2006
Rudy Ricciotti buildings
2006 establishments in France
21st-century architecture in France